Pira, Tarragona is a village in the province of Tarragona and autonomous community of Catalonia, Spain.

References

External links
 
 Government data pages 
Article in the Enciclopedia Catalana (in Catalan)

Municipalities in Conca de Barberà